Fawn Pedalino is an American politician of the Republican Party. She is the member of the South Carolina House of Representatives representing District 64. In the 2022 general election for South Carolina House of Representatives District 64, Pedalino defeated Democratic incumbent Kimberly O. Johnson, who had been a member of the South Carolina House since 2020. She is a member of the Edisto Natchez-Kusso Tribe of South Carolina, one of South Carolina's recognized Native American entities.

Statements were issued by Henry McMaster, Governor of South Carolina who won his re-election bid, and Drew McKissick, chair of the South Carolina Republican Party.

Pedalino serves on the House Interstate Cooperation Committee and the Medical, Military, Public and Municipal Affairs Committee. 

In 2023, Pedalino was briefly among the Republican co-sponsors of the South Carolina Prenatal Equal Protection Act of 2023, which would make women who had abortions eligible for the death penalty; she later withdrew her sponsorship.

References 

Living people
Republican Party members of the South Carolina House of Representatives
Women state legislators in South Carolina
Year of birth missing (living people)